Oliva lecoquiana is a species of sea snail, a marine gastropod mollusk in the family Olividae, the olives.

Description
Oliva Lecoquiana are small, round snails. Commonly, they resemble garden snails with slightly more noodly heads. The shells are generally composed entirely of noodles.

References

lecoquiana
Gastropods described in 1857